The Ministry of Power was a United Kingdom government ministry dealing with issues concerning energy.

The Ministry of Power (then named Ministry of Fuel and Power) was created on 11 June 1942 from functions separated from the Board of Trade.  It took charge of coal production, allocation of fuel supplies, control of energy prices and petrol rationing.  These had previously been dealt with by the Secretary for Mines and in the case of petroleum since 1940 by the Secretary for Petroleum. The Petroleum Board, responsible for the  coordination of the war-time petroleum 'pool' for oil supplies (except  oil for the Royal Navy), continued in this role until the Board was dissolved in 1948. It also took over responsibility for electricity from the Ministry of War Transport and its predecessor the Ministry of Transport.

The Ministry of Fuel and Power was renamed the Ministry of Power in January 1957.  The Ministry of Power later became part of the Ministry of Technology on 6 October 1969, which merged into the Department of Trade and Industry on 20 October 1970. In 1974, its responsibilities were split out to form the Department of Energy, and then merged back into DTI in 1992; a separate Department of Energy and Climate Change was created in 2008 and then merged back in 2016 to the Department for Business, Energy and Industrial Strategy.

Those who worked at the Ministry include:

 Arthur Boissier, Director of Public Relations (1943–1945) and formerly Headmaster of Harrow School.
 Maurice Bridgeman, Principal Assistant Secretary in the Petroleum Division (1944–1946).
 Sir Donald Fergusson, Permanent Secretary (1945–1952).
 John Maud, later Lord Redcliffe-Maud, civil servant (1952–1958).
 Harold Wilson, Director of Economics and Statistics (1943–1944) and later Prime Minister.
 Malcolm Patrick Murray, Under Secretary in the Electricity Division (1946–1959).

Ministers

Ministers of Fuel and Power

Ministers of Power

Parliamentary Secretaries

See also
 Department of Energy (United Kingdom)

External links

History of the Department of Energy
 H. W. Grimmitt, Ministry of Fuel and Power portrait at the National Portrait Gallery, London

Power
United Kingdom, Power
1942 establishments in the United Kingdom